Buri Ram station, 1st class station is the main railway station in Buriram Province located on the northern side of the town of Buriram.

Local Meatballs  
In front of the station is a source of a Buri Ram local food known as Luk-chin yuen kin (ลูกชิ้นยืนกิน) "meatballs stand to eat". Customers can order  meatballs, sausages, crispy wontons, crab sticks, fishcakes which are fried on the spot.  Customers usually eat them on the spot and add sauces by dipping their skewer into a variety of dipping sauces. Buri Ram K-pop singer Lalisa Manobal stated that she greatly likes to eat these meatballs.

Train services 
 Special express No. 21 from Bangkok to Ubon Ratchathani
 Special express No. 22 from Ubon Ratchathani to Bangkok
 Special express No. 23 from Bangkok to Ubon Ratchathani
 Special express No. 24 from Ubon Ratchathani to Bangkok
 Express No. 67 from Bangkok to Ubon Ratchathani
 Express No. 68 from Ubon Ratchathani to Bangkok
 Express No. 71 from Bangkok to Ubon Ratchathani
 Express No. 72 from Ubon Ratchathani to Bangkok
 Rapid train No. 135 from Bangkok to Ubon Ratchathani
 Rapid train No. 136 from Ubon Ratchathani to Bangkok
 Rapid train No. 139 from Bangkok to Ubon Ratchathani
 Rapid train No. 140 from Ubon Ratchathani to Bangkok
 Rapid train No. 141 from Bangkok to Ubon Ratchathani
 Rapid train No. 142 from Ubon Ratchathani to Bangkok
 Rapid train No. 145 from Bangkok to Ubon Ratchathani
 Rapid train No. 146 from Ubon Ratchathani to Bangkok
 Ordinary train No. 233 from Bangkok to Surin
 Ordinary train No. 234 from Surin to Bangkok
 Local train No. 419 from Nakhon Ratchasima to Ubon Ratchathani
 Local train No. 420 from Ubon Ratchathani to Nakhon Ratchasima
 Local train No. 421 from Nakhon Ratchasima to Ubon Ratchathani
 Local train No. 426 from Ubon Ratchathani to Nakhon Ratchasima
 Local train No. 424 from Samrong Thab to Nakhon Ratchasima
 Local train No. 427 from Nakhon Ratchasima to Ubon Ratchathani
 Local train No. 428 from Ubon Ratchathani to Nakhon Ratchasima

Gallery

References

Sources
 Annual Report on Royal Siamese State Railways in the Year Buddhist Era 2477, Royal State Railway Printing Office, BE 2481 (1938). (stored in National Archives of Thailand)
 Karn Rot Fai Thai, Royal State Railway Printing Office, BE 2484 (1941). (stored in National Library of Thailand)
 In Memory of Prince Purajat Jaiyakorn, Royal State Railway Printing Office, April BE 2480 (1937).
 Ngan Chalong 50 Pee Rot Fa Luang, Royal State Railway Printing Office, April BE 2490 (1947).

Railway stations in Thailand
Buildings and structures in Buriram province
Railway stations opened in 1925